Katakana is a Unicode block containing katakana characters for the Japanese and Ainu languages.

Block

History
The following Unicode-related documents record the purpose and process of defining specific characters in the Katakana block:

See also 
 Katakana Phonetic Extensions (Unicode block)
 Kana Extended-A (Unicode block)
 Kana Extended-B (Unicode block)
 Kana Supplement (Unicode block)
 Small Kana Extension (Unicode block)
 Hiragana (Unicode block)
 CJK Compatibility (Unicode block)
 Enclosed CJK Letters and Months (Unicode block)
 Halfwidth and Fullwidth Forms (Unicode block)

References 

Unicode blocks
Kana